Jan Fabo (born 4 March 1963 in Partizánske) is a Slovak sport shooter. He competed in pistol shooting events at the Summer Olympics in 1996 and 2000.

Olympic results

References

1963 births
Living people
ISSF pistol shooters
Slovak male sport shooters
Olympic shooters of Slovakia
Shooters at the 1996 Summer Olympics
Shooters at the 2000 Summer Olympics
People from Partizánske
Sportspeople from the Trenčín Region